Andrei Vasilyev may refer to:
 Andrey Vasilyev (born 1962), Russian rower
 Andrei Vasilyev (ice hockey) (born 1972), Russian ice hockey player
 Andrei Vasilyev (footballer) (born 1992), Russian footballer